The Cat in the Bag is a 1964 drama film by Gilles Groulx, which played a seminal role in the development of Quebec cinema. The film's themes, improvisational style, hand-held camera work and evocative music signalled the emergence of a new generation of Quebec films and filmmakers.

An American girl, an actress who runs a theater, does not share the troubles and struggles between the two. Claude leaves Montreal for the Quebec countryside to reflect on his life, and with the distance between them, their love fades.

Cast
 Barbara Ulrich as Barbara
 Claude Godbout as Claude
 Manon Blain as Manon J'sais-pas-qui
 Véronique Vilbert as Véronique
 Jean-Paul Bernier as Jean-Paul
 André Leblanc as Toulouse
 Paul-Marie Lapointe as Messieurs - ont joué trois personages
 Jean-V. Dufresne as Messieurs - ont joué trois personages (as Jean V. Dufresne)
 Pierre Maheu as Messieurs - ont joué trois personages

Production

In 1963, Gilles Groulx presented Grant McLean, the director of production at the National Film Board, with a film outline that did not even fill an entire page. The film was shot on a budget of $45,982.

Critical response
Critic Robert Daudelin stated that “At last we were confronted by a film which really belonged to us, one in which we were happy to recognize ourselves and see ourselves close up. [It] was (and remains) the image of our most recent awakenings.”

It received the Grand Prix at the 1964 Montreal International Film Festival. Le Chat dans le sac was identified as a “culturally significant film” by the AV Preservation Trust through the 2002 Masterworks programme. It was screened at the 18th Berlin Film Festival in 1968 as part of Young Canadian Film, a lineup of films by emerging Canadian filmmakers.

It was later screened at the 1984 Festival of Festivals as part of Front & Centre, a special retrospective program of artistically and culturally significant films from throughout the history of Canadian cinema.

See also
Blue World, a 2019 album featuring John Coltrane's recordings for this soundtrack

References

Works cited

External links

Watch the French-language (with English subtitles) version The Cat in the Bag and the original French-language version at NFB.ca

1964 films
Films directed by Gilles Groulx
Films set in Montreal
Films shot in Montreal
National Film Board of Canada films
Canadian drama films
1964 drama films
Films produced by Jacques Bobet
1960s French-language films
French-language Canadian films
1960s Canadian films